Gurmukh (Punjabi: ਗੁਰਮੁਖ)  means "Coming from the persona of the Guru" or "To be in the character or personality of the Guru" and implies to be God centred.

The higher spiritual meaning is one who has met the Guru within, in meditation and remains in the will of the Guru or attempts to follow the Guru's teachings wholeheartedly. In daily life, it describes one who is living a wholesome life in support of the spirit, as instructed by the Guru.

The word Gurmukh is a common word and is found frequently throughout Gurbani (compositions of the Sikh Gurus)

In contrast, a Manmukh is one who follows the dictates of the mind - indulging in the senses, animal behaviors, greed, corruption, and the base desires of the mind.

See also
Gurmukhī script
Manmukh
Gurmat
Patit

References

External links
 Global Sikh Studies - Articles

Sikh terminology
Sikh beliefs